Ziesendorf is a municipality  in the Rostock district, in Mecklenburg-Vorpommern, Germany. The Mayor of Ziesendorf is Thomas Witt (Aktive Gemeinde Ziesendorf).

References